On July 31, 2007, Jordan held mayoral and council elections in 94 municipalities. As in past elections, the Municipality of Greater Amman (MOGA) was exempt from the full election; only half of the 68-member council was elected, while the other half of the MOGA council, along with the mayor, was appointed by the King of Jordan.

The elections were the first to take place under new legislation that guarantees at least twenty percent of elected positions to women candidates and lowers the age of eligible voters from 19 to 18.

Results
Ajlun Governorate

Amman Governorate

Aqaba Governorate

Balqa Governorate

Irbid Governorate

Jerash Governorate

Kerak Governorate

Ma'an Governorate

Madaba Governorate

Mafraq Governorate

Tafilah Governorate

Zarqa Governorate

External links
Municipality of Greater Amman
Ministry Of Municipal Affairs
Official Results in Arabic

2007 in Jordan
Local elections in Jordan
July 2007 events in Asia
2007 elections in Asia